Muhammad ibn Adam Al-Kawthari is a British Sunni Islamic scholar, mufti, researcher, founder and chief-Mufti of Darul Ifta Leicester and a teacher at Jamiah Uloom-ul-Quran Leicester. He has authored a number of books including Islamic Guide to Sexual Relations and Birth Control & Abortion in Islam. He has written a marginalia to the Deobandi creed book Al-Muhannad ala al-Mufannad in Arabic language.

Biography
Al-Kawthari's father Mawlana Adam is one of the senior scholars in England. Shaykh Adam Square in Leicester is named after him.  Born in Leicester, Al-Kawthari graduated from Darul Uloom Bury and later studied with Muhammad Taqi Usmani at Darul Uloom Karachi. His other teachers include his father Mawlana Adam and Yusuf Motala. During 2000, he studied from Abd al-Razzaq al-Halabi and Abd al-Latif Farfur al-Hasani in Syria.

Al-Kawthari is founder and Chief-Mufti of Darul Ifta Leicester and a teacher at Jamiah Uloom-ul-Quran Leicester. He also teaches traditional Islamic sciences in London. He is an Islamic jurist and researcher.

Literary works
Al-Kawthari's literary works include:
 Islamic Guide to Sexual Relations (translated in German as Ehe und Liebesleben im Islam).
 Birth Control & Abortion in Islam
 Mabahith fi 'Aqa'id Ahl al-Sunna (a marginalia in Arabic language to Al-Muhannad alal Mufannad, the creed book of Deobandis, authored by Khalil Ahmad Saharanpuri)
 Al-Arbaʿin: Elucidation of Forty Hadiths on Marriage
 The Issue of Shares and Simplified Rules of Zakat

References

Muftis
Sunni fiqh scholars
Jamia Darul Uloom, Karachi alumni

Living people
Year of birth missing (living people)

People from Leicester
People educated at Darul Uloom Bury
Islamic scholars in the United Kingdom
Students of Muhammad Taqi Usmani